Sheikh Abu Nasir Farahi is a dry port and a border control point located next to the Afghanistan–Iran border in the Shib Koh District of Farah Province in western Afghanistan. It is the official port of entry by land from the village of Mahirud in Iran. The port plays an important role when it comes to the economy of Afghanistan because a substantial volume of national trade passes through it.

Abu Nasir is one of the major transporting, shipping, and receiving sites in Afghanistan. It is named in honor of the 13th-century Abu Nasr Farahi, a local from Farah, Afghanistan. A number of facilities and parking areas are located at the site, including Afghan government offices. The Abu Nasir–Farah Highway starts at the border gate and connects after  with the Kandahar–Herat Highway near the city of Farah in the east. It is one of three important trade-routes that connect Central Asia, East Asia and South Asia with the Middle East.

See also
Land border crossings of Afghanistan

References 

Populated places in Farah Province
Afghanistan–Iran border crossings